Clan Napier is a Lowland Scottish clan.

History

Origins of the clan

Traditional origins
Traditionally the Napiers are descended from the ancient Earls of Lennox who were one of the Celtic royal families of Scotland and Ireland. One theory holds that a "naperer" is "a person in charge of table linen in a royal or manor house" and that the original Napiers must have been "naperers" as an office for the royal household. However, there is not much evidence for this title being used in Scotland. Another origin for the name is that one of the knights of the Earl of Lennox, possibly a younger son of the earl, distinguished himself in battle in support of William the Lion. After the victory the king singled him out praising his valour by saying "nae peer".

In 1625, Sir Archibald Napier of Merchiston, the first Lord Napier, presented an affidavit to the College of Heralds, in which he described this origin of the name Napier, as having been bestowed by the king (probably Alexander II) on one Donald Lennox in recognition for acts of bravery.  He states:

Recorded origins

The first certain reference to the name Napier is in a charter of Malcolm, Earl of Lennox some time before 1290, in which he granted lands to John de Naper in Kilmahew and Dunbartonshire. The Napiers held the lands at Kilmahew for eighteen generations until 1820.

15th century and clan conflicts

The first Lord of Merchiston was Alexander Napier who was a prominent merchant in Edinburgh. He amassed a fortune and became Provost of Edinburgh. He obtained a charter for the lands of Merchiston in 1436. His son was Sir Alexander Napier, who also became Provost of Edinburgh and rose to high royal favour. He was wounded rescuing the widow of James I of Scotland and her second husband, Sir James Stewart, who had been captured by rebels. In 1440 Napier was honoured by James II of Scotland by being made Comptroller of the Royal Household and was later also made Vice Admiral of Scotland in 1461. His son was John Napier who was also the son-in-law of the Earl of Lennox who was executed in 1444. John did not press the family's claim to the earldom and was killed at the Battle of Sauchieburn in 1488.

16th century and Anglo-Scottish Wars

John Napier's heir, Alexander, and also his grandson were both killed in 1513 at the Battle of Flodden. Another Napier heir was killed at the Battle of Pinkie Cleugh in 1547.

17th century and Civil War

The most famous of the name was John Napier the seventeenth Laird of Merchiston who developed the system of Logarithm. In 1617 he was succeeded by his son, Archibald Napier, 1st Lord Napier who accompanied James VI and I to claim his new throne in England. Napier married the daughter of the fourth Earl of Montrose and sister of James Graham, 1st Marquess of Montrose. As the brother-in-law of the king's captain the Napiers supported the king throughout the Scottish Civil War. Lord Napier died in 1645 and his only son, Archibald Napier, 2nd Lord Napier, was forced into exile and died in the Netherlands in 1660.

Archibald Napier, 3rd Lord Napier petitioned to the Crown for a new patent to the barony and extended the succession to female heirs. The title passed to the only child of his eldest sister, Thomas Nicolson, 4th Lord Napier. The title then passed to his aunt, Margaret Napier, wife of John Brisbane who was Secretary to the Admiralty in the reign of Charles II of England. She was succeeded by her grandson, Francis Napier, 6th Lord Napier, who was originally Francis Scott but adopted the name and arms of Napier.

Napoleonic Wars

Three grandsons of the sixth Lord Napier served throughout the Napoleonic Wars. General Sir Charles Napier conquered Sind in India, which is now part of Pakistan and his statue can still be seen in Trafalgar Square, London.

Castles

Kilmahew Castle, Cardross, Dunbartonshire, is the ancestral home of the Napiers of Kilmahew.  It is now a ruin.
Merchiston Tower, Edinburgh, is the ancestral home of the Napiers of Merchiston.  It is the centre of the Merchiston Campus of Napier University.
Other castles built or owned by the Napiers include Culcreuch Castle (Fintry, Stirlingshire) and Lauriston Castle (Edinburgh).

Clan chief

The current chief of the clan is the Right Honourable Francis David Charles Napier, 15th Lord Napier, 6th Baron Ettrick, and 12th Baronet of Nova Scotia.

Heraldry

The Clan Napier does not possess a coat of arms.  In Scotland it is primarily individuals that are granted coats of arms.  The arms of the Clan Chief, or to give him his full title, Chief of the Name and Arms of Napier are:  Quarterly, 1st & 4th, Argent, a saltire engrailed cantoned of four roses Gules, barbed Vert; 2nd & 3rd, Or, on a bend Azure, a mullet pierced between two crescents of the Field, within a double tressure flory counterflory of the Second (see article on heraldry).  The chief of the clan is the only person permitted to use these arms.

The original arms of Napier (as seen in the picture of John Napier on this page) were: Argent, a saltire engrailed between four roses gules, barbed vert.  These arms bear striking similarity to the arms of the Clan Lennox (see origin of the clan, above, for explanation).  The arms of the current chief are the Napier arms quartered with a differenced version of the Scott coat of arms, added when the Napier family absorbed the Scott Baronetcy of Thirlestane (see Lord Napier).

Trivia

The Western Australia Police Pipe Band, a Pipe band based in Perth, Australia, has worn the Napier tartan since 1966.

The University of Queensland Pipe Band at Emmanuel College, a pipe Band based in Brisbane, Australia, has worn the Napier tartan since 1998.

The Napier Boys' High School Pipe Band, in the city of Napier, New Zealand, have been wearing the Napier tartan since 1976.

See also
Lord Napier
Napier Baronets
Napier (surname)

References

External links
Official Clan Napier website

 
Napier